The Zimbabwe A cricket team is a national cricket team representing Zimbabwe.  It is the second-tier of international Zimbabwean cricket, below the full Zimbabwe national cricket team.  Matches played by Zimbabwe A are not considered to be Test matches or One Day Internationals, instead receiving first-class and List A classification respectively.  Zimbabwe A played their first match in January 1994, a four-day first-class contest against the touring South Africa A cricket team.

International seasons summary 
Zimbabwe A have played a number of series, both home and away, against other full national teams, national A teams, and competed against other first-class opposition.  Their first tour was that of South Africa in 1995–96. Zimbabwe A team participates in ICC Africa Division 1 that is played as a gateway to ICC World Twenty20 Qualifier. Although Zimbabwe national cricket team is qualified for ICC World Twenty20s as a full member, the team A plays in the Africa division as a supporting team.

Zimbabwe was scheduled to tour Bangladesh A in Bangladesh in June 2014. However, the Bangladesh Cricket Board decided to move the dates because of the monsoon season and invited Zimbabwe to tour in July–August. Zimbabwe Cricket had to refuse the offer because it was hosting South Africa and then a Tri-series against Australia and South Africa at that time.

In July 2014, the team was scheduled to play two List A matches against Afghanistan before four ODIs and two first-class matches.

The Zimbabwe A cricket team are playing four unofficial One Day International matches (with List A status) and two unofficial Test matches (with first-class status) in May and June 2021 against the South Africa A cricket team.

References

External links
 Zimbabwe Cricket

Cricket
Zimbabwe in international cricket
National 'A' cricket teams